Mbanza-Kongo (or , known as São Salvador in Portuguese from 1570 to 1975), is the capital of Angola's northwestern Zaire Province with a population of 148,000 (2014). Mbanza Kongo (properly Mbanza Koongo or Kôngo in most acceptable orthographies) was founded some time before the arrival of the Portuguese in 1483 and was the capital of the Kilukeni dynasty ruling at that time. The site was temporarily abandoned during civil wars in the 17th century. It lies close to Angola's border with the Democratic Republic of the Congo. In the valley to the south runs the Luezi River. In 2017, Mbanza Kongo was declared as a UNESCO World Heritage Site.

History
Mbanza-Kongo (formerly called Nkumba a Ngudi, Mongo wa Kaila and Kongo dia Ngunga ) was once the home of the Manikongo, the ruler of the Kingdom of Kongo, which at its peak reached from southern Africa's Atlantic coast to the Nkisi River. The Manikongo was chosen by clan leaders to rule some 300 mi2, an area that today is part of several countries. The Portuguese who first reached it in 1491 travelled ten days to get there from the mouth of the Congo River.

The earliest documented kings referred to their city in their correspondence as "the city of Congo" (cidade do Congo), and the name of the city as São Salvador appears for the first time in the letters of Álvaro I of Kongo  (1568–1587) and was carried on by his successors. The name was changed back to "City of Kongo" (Mbanza Kongo) after Angolan independence in 1975.

When the Portuguese arrived in Kongo, Mbanza Kongo was already a large town, perhaps the largest in sub-equatorial Africa, and a letter from the Portuguese ambassador to Lisbon compared the size of the city (inside the inner walls) to the Portuguese town of Évora. During the reign of Afonso II, stone buildings were added, including a palace and several churches. The town grew substantially as the kingdom of Kongo expanded and grew, and an ecclesiastical statement of the 1630s related that 4,000-5,000 baptisms were performed in the city and its immediate hinterland (presumably the valleys that surround it), which is consistent with an overall population of 100,000 people.  Of these, perhaps 30,000 lived on the mountain and the remainder in the valleys around the city. Among its important buildings were some twelve churches, including São Salvador, as well as private chapels and oratories and an impressive two-story royal palace, the only such building in all of Kongo, according to visitor Giovanni Francesco da Roma (1648).

The city was sacked several times during the civil wars that followed the Battle of Mbwila (or Ulanga) in 1665, and was abandoned in 1678.  It was reoccupied in 1705 by Dona Beatriz Kimpa Vita's followers and restored as Kongo's capital by King Pedro IV of Kongo in 1709.  It was never again depopulated though its population fluctuated substantially during the eighteenth and nineteenth century.

Climate
M'banza-Kongo has a tropical savanna climate (Köppen Aw) similar to Kinshasa or Pointe-Noire, characterised by a fairly long though not intense wet season from October to May, and a relatively short but almost rainless dry season from June to September caused by the strong influence of the cold Benguela Current during this period.

Sites

M'banza Kongo is known for the ruins of its 16th century Cathedral of the Holy Saviour of Congo (built in 1549), which many Angolans claim is the oldest church in sub-Saharan Africa. The present-day church, called São Salvador, known locally as nkulumbimbi, is now said to have been built by angels overnight.  It was elevated to the status of cathedral in 1596. Pope John Paul II visited the site during his tour of Angola in 1992.

Another interesting site of historical significance is the memorial to King Afonso I's mother near the airport, which commemorates a popular legend that began in the 1680s that the king had buried his mother alive because she was not willing to give up an "idol" which she wore around her neck.

Other important sites include the Jalankuwo, the Manikongo's judgement tree, which can still be found in the downtown area of the city, along with the sunguilu, a rectangular ground level structure where local tradition says the king's body was washed before burial. Both are on the grounds of the royal palace and present day Royal Museum.

The Royal Museum, recently rebuilt as a modern structure, houses an impressive collection of artifacts from the old Kingdom, even though many were lost from the older building during the Civil War of 1976–2002.

References

Bibliography
Ndamba, Josué. Kongo Kultur Vol.4. 2021 : Réhabiliter et s’approprier MBanza Kongo. La Loupe, N'Tamo (Brazzaville), Paris: Paari éditeur, 2022. (in French)

External links
Explore M'banza-Kongo with Google Earth on Global Heritage Network

Capitals of former nations
Provincial capitals in Angola
Populated places in Zaire Province
Municipalities of Angola
Former populated places in Angola
Kingdom of Kongo
Populated places established in the 1480s
World Heritage Sites in Angola